The 2017 season was Reading FC Women's second season in the FA WSL 1, after winning promotion from the FA WSL 2 in 2015.

Following a reorganisation of top-level women's football in England, the 2017 season will only cover half of a traditional season's length, while the FA WSL shifts its calendar to match the traditional autumn-to-spring axis of football in Europe. For the same reason, there is no Champions League qualification nor relegation to be competed for.

Season events
On 14 November 2016, Reading signed Mandy van den Berg from Liverpool.

On 9 January, Mary Earps signed an 18-month contract extension with Reading, keeping her at the club until June 2018.

On 12 January 2017, Reading signed Rachel Furness from Sunderland, with Brooke Chaplen making the same move at the end of January.

Lauren Bruton extended her contract with Reading on 19 January, until the summer of 2018.

On 23 January, Melissa Fletcher signed her first professional contract with the club, until June 2018, with Charlie Estcourt signing a similar deal on 25 January, and Becky Jane signed a new contract with Reading until June 2019 on 26 January.

On 24 January, New Zealand international defender Anna Green from Swedish club Mallbackens IF.

On 6 February, Reading signed a new contract with Kirsty McGee, until June 2018, with Harriet Scott also signing a new 18-month contract with Reading on 9 February.

On 8 February, Emma Follis was sold to Birmingham City for an undisclosed fee.

On 8 April, Anissa Lahmari joined Reading on a two-month loan deal from Paris Saint-Germain.

On 1 May, Reading signed Jo Potter, Jade Moore and Kirsty Linnett from recently folded Notts County.

Squad

Transfers

In

Loans in

Out

Released

Pre-season

Competitions

Women's Super League

Results summary

Results by matchday

Results

League table

FA Cup

Squad statistics

Appearances 

|-
|colspan="14"|Players away from the club on loan:
|-
|colspan="14"|Players who appeared for Reading but left during the season:
|}

Goal scorers

Clean sheets

Disciplinary record

Honours

 2016–17 PFA Team of the Year:  Mary Earps

References

Reading F.C. Women